Internet Mail 2000 is an Internet mail architecture proposed by Daniel J. Bernstein (and in subsequent years separately proposed by several others), designed with the precept that the initial storage of mail messages be the responsibility of the sender, and not of the recipient as it is with the SMTP-based Internet mail architecture.

Whereas the SMTP-based Internet mail architecture has a close analogue in the architecture of paper mail, this is not the case for Internet Mail 2000.  Its architecture depends on various things that are unique to the natures of the Internet and to electronic messages.  One of its goals is to reduce spam.

Implementations 
Over the years since Daniel J. Bernstein proposed it, several attempts have been made to design and to implement a real Internet Mail 2000 system, with varying degrees of achievement.  The closest thing to a concrete, open implementation of the system is Meng Weng Wong's StubMail, which was presented at Google in July 2006.

See also 
Bernstein has also proposed the Quick Mail Transfer Protocol (QMTP).

External links 
 Daniel J. Bernstein's original IM2000 outline (2000)
 Brett Watson's proposal (2002)
 JFC Morfin's proposal (2003) describing weemail
  — Jonathan de Boyne Pollard's detailed proposed specifications and elaboration of the system
 Duan's, Dong's, and Gopalan's proposal (2004) and subsequent Internet Draft (2006) describing Differentiated Mail Transfer Protocol (DMTP)
 Nathan Cheng's proposal (2006) describing Hypertext Mail Protocol (HTMP)
 Andrew Walrond's HeresyMail (seems to be abandoned?)
 Chrobok's, Trotman's, and O'Keefe's proposal which extends SMTP with Internet Mail 2000 features (General delivery)

Email